Vidhaata ( Creator) is a 1982 Indian action drama film directed by Subhash Ghai and produced by Gulshan Rai under his own production company Trimurti Films. It stars Dilip Kumar, Shammi Kapoor, Sanjeev Kumar, Sanjay Dutt, Padmini Kolhapure, Madan Puri, Amrish Puri, Suresh Oberoi, Sarika in pivotal roles. The film was remade in Kannada as Pithamaha, in Malayalam as Alakadalinakkare, and in Tamil as Vamsa Vilakku. Vidhaata was the highest-grossing Indian film of 1982 and the fifth highest-grossing Indian film of the decade, when adjusted for inflation, being declared an "All Time Blockbuster" at the box office.

Synopsis

Shamsher Singh, his son Pratap Singh, and daughter-in-law lead a happy life in an Indian village. Shamsher works as an engine driver with his friend Gurbaksh Singh. Pratap is appointed as the new inspector-in-charge of the village, but is killed brutally by Jagawar Chaudhary, a notorious local smuggler, after Pratap refuses to help Jagawar in his illegal activities. Seeing his son dead, Shamsher Singh is enraged and he kills some of Jagawar's goons whom he had seen throwing his son's dead body in the forest. When he is about to inquire from one of Jagawar's men about the person behind his son's murder, he is stopped by the police and is asked to surrender; Shamsher somehow manages to escape. His daughter-in-law dies while giving birth to Kunal Singh.

Shamsher takes his grandson Kunal and leaves his village to hide from the police. In the hope of making quick money, to secure his grandson's future, Shamsher starts working for Sir Mizya, a powerful underworld don, and takes on a new identity as Sir Shobraj. Over the course of time, he becomes a wealthy and powerful smuggler and the chairman of the Mizya Group.

Meanwhile, Kunal grows up under the strict supervision of Shamsher's loyal employee Abu Baba. He falls in love with Durga, a beautiful slum girl and the daughter of one of Shamsher's old employee Ganpat. However, things take an ugly turn when Shamsher Singh disagrees to let Kunal marry Durga because of her being from a poor background; he instead warns Durga's mother to leave the city with her daughter or else face serious consequences.

Although Durga is unwilling to leave at first, she later agrees to sacrifice her love and leaves with her mother in a ship to Goa where Shamsher's men try to rape her. Abu Baba comes to their rescue and saves them but is killed by Shamsher's men with the help of Jagawar, who has become a powerful smuggler of Goa. Kunal is devastated after seeing Abu Baba's dead body and promises to take revenge. His investigations into Abu Baba's death eventually lead to the true identity of his grandfather and about his father's killers.

Cast

Dilip Kumar as Shamsher Singh / Shobhraj
Shammi Kapoor as Gurbaksh
Sanjeev Kumar as Abu
Sanjay Dutt as Kunal Singh 
Padmini Kolhapure as Durga
Madan Puri as Khushaal Singh / K.K.
Amrish Puri as Jagawar Chaudhary
Suresh Oberoi as Inspector Pratap Singh 
Shreeram Lagoo as Sir Miziya 
Sarika as Neelima
Madhu Malhotra as Lily
Sudhir as Ballu
Tom Alter as David
Krishan Dhawan as Ganpat
Sudha Shivpuri as Mrs. Ganpat
Jagdeep as Peter John D'Costa 
Paintal  as Muthuswamy
Birbal as Bheema
Mukri as Dance Organizer

Awards & Nominations

Soundtrack
All songs are composed by Kalyanji-Anandji. All lyrics were written by Anand Bakshi.

References

External links 
 

Trimurti Films
1980s Hindi-language films
1982 films
Films scored by Kalyanji Anandji
Films directed by Subhash Ghai
Hindi films remade in other languages